Muhammet Akyıldız (born 1 September 1995) is a Turkish footballer who plays for Elaziz Belediyespor on loan from Elazığspor. He made his Süper Lig debut on 17 May 2014.

References

External links
 
 Muhammet Akyıldız at eurosport.com
 Muhammet Akyıldız at goal.com
 
 

1995 births
Living people
People from Elazığ
Turkish footballers
Elazığspor footballers
Süper Lig players
Association football forwards